Azure Bluet may refer to:
 Houstonia caerulea, a North American plant
 Enallagma aspersum, a North American damselfly
 Azure Damselfly, a European damselfly